4776 Luyi, provisional designation , is a bright background asteroid from the inner regions of the asteroid belt, approximately  in diameter. It was discovered on 3 November 1975, by Harvard astronomers at the Oak Ridge Observatory in Massachusetts, United States. The asteroid was named for the Chinese town of Luyi, birthplace of Laozi who founded Taoism. Luyi is also named after the son of Harvard astronomer Cheng-yuan Shao.

Orbit and classification 

Luyi is a non-family asteroid from the main belt's background population. It orbits the Sun in the inner asteroid belt at a distance of 1.8–2.9 AU once every 3 years and 6 months (1,286 days; semi-major axis of 2.31 AU). Its orbit has an eccentricity of 0.23 and an inclination of 5° with respect to the ecliptic. The body's observation arc begins with its first and official discovery observation at Oak Ridge.

Physical characteristics 

The asteroid has an absolute magnitude of 14.3. Its spectral type is unknown. Based on its high albedo (see below), Luyi is a bright asteroid of the S-complex. As of 2018, no rotational lightcurve has been obtained from photometric observations. The body's rotation period, pole and shape remain unknown.

Diameter and albedo 

According to the survey carried out by the NEOWISE mission of NASA's Wide-field Infrared Survey Explorer, the asteroid measures 3.645 kilometers in diameter and its surface has a high albedo of 0.30.

Naming 

This minor planet was named after a town in the eastern Henan province of China that was the birthplace of Laozi, founder of Taoism, because long-time participant in Harvard's minor-planet program, astronomer Cheng-yuan Shao (born 1927), came from that town (also see 1881 Shao). The asteroid is also named after his son, Luyi.

The official naming citation was published by the Minor Planet Center on 21 November 1991.

References

External links 
 Asteroid Lightcurve Database (LCDB), query form (info )
 Dictionary of Minor Planet Names, Google books
 Discovery Circumstances: Numbered Minor Planets (1)-(5000) – Minor Planet Center
 
 

004776
004776
Named minor planets
19751103